The Air Force Audit Agency (AFAA) is a Field Operating Agency (FOA) of the United States Air Force that provides all levels of Air Force management with audit services and assesses Air Force financial stewardship and the accuracy of financial reporting.

History
Originally established as the 1030th USAF Auditor General group on 1 July 1948, the AFAA was redesignated a separate operating agency under the Comptroller of the Air Force on 31 December 1971. On 24 July 1978, the AFAA was transferred under the Secretary of the Air Force with oversight from the Assistant Secretary of the Air Force.

In 1986, the Department of Defense reorganization resulted in significant changes within the Secretariat of the Air Force. The Auditor General of the Air Force then reported directly to the Secretary of the Air Force, with no oversight or supervision from other Secretariat offices.

References

External links
 

Field operating agencies of the United States Air Force